Cook (postcode: 2614) is a suburb of the Belconnen district of Canberra, located within the Australian Capital Territory, Australia.

The suburb of Cook is named after Captain James Cook and the sixth Prime Minister of Australia Sir Joseph Cook. The streets in Cook are named after notable women from Australian history.

Suburb amenities

Cook has a small shopping centre including the Cook Grocer independent supermarket, Little Oink coffee shop, To All My Friends bar, Jina's Hair Salon for men, Prestige Oysters fish monger and a public toilet.
Cook Community Hub, in place of the Cook Primary School which was a government run school for children in years K-6 until closed at the end of 2007 as part of a rationalisation of primary education across the ACT with most students moving to neighbouring schools in Aranda, Macquarie and Weetangera.
Cook Preschool
Cook school park

Political representation 

For the purposes of Australian federal elections for the House of Representatives, Cook is in the Division of Canberra.

For the purposes of Australian Capital Territory elections for the ACT Legislative Assembly, Cook is in the Ginninderra electorate.

Geology

Greywacke from the Ordovician Pittman Formation forms a band down the east of Cook.   This has been uplifted on the east side of the Deakin Fault.  The fault heads in the north north west direction in Cook. A porphyry of Green-grey Dacitic intrusive containing large white feldspar crystals is found in the north east corner of Cook. Mount Painter Volcanics dark grey to grey green crystal tuff is found in the center and south and south west. Green grey rhyodacite of the Walker Volcanics underlie the north west.

References

Suburbs of Canberra